Josep Guia i Marín (born 1947, in Valencia) is a Spanish writer, mathematics professor of University of Valencia and political activist within PSAN party. In 1986, he was awarded by Fundació Jaume I.

Some of his most relevant essays about Catalan nationalism are: Països Catalans i Llibertat ("Catalan Countries and Freedom) (1983), És molt senzill, digueu-li Catalunya ("It's very easy, call it Catalonia") (1985), Des de la Catalunya del Sud ("From Southern Catalonia") (1987), València, 750 anys de nació catalana (Valencia, 750 years of Catalan Nation) (1988)) and Catalunya descoberta ("Catalonia, discovered") (1990). He is an editor of Lluita magazine.

External links 
 Biographical information in Catalan language writers association webpage

Catalan-language writers
Politics of Catalonia
People from Valencia
Politicians from the Valencian Community
1947 births
Living people